The Double Mouth Nature Reserve, part of the greater East London Coast Nature Reserve, is a coastal reserve in the Wild Coast region of the Eastern Cape. Alongside it are the Quko River mouth and the 50-metre high Morgan Bay Cliffs.

Biodiversity 
The mouth of the Quko River which forms an estuary and the nearby forested dunes host a large number of birds and animals.

Mammals 
This includes the Cape bushbuck, blue duiker, mongoose, vervet monkeys,  porcupines, legavaan, jackals and the endangered African clawless otter.

Birds 
Raptors such as the African fish eagle, Cape vulture, spotted eagle-owl and African wood owl.

Activities 
The Double Mouth Nature Reserve offers fishing, camping, dolphin spotting, mountain biking and hiking trails. On the Bead Beach in the reserve money cowries, Chinese Ming porcelain and Carnelian beads can sometimes be found; this is thought to come from the Santo Espirito shipwreck in 1608. Nearby is the protected village of Haga Haga, the Morgan Bay Cliffs and Cape Morgan Nature Reserve.

See also 

 List of protected areas of South Africa

References 

Nature reserves in South Africa
Tourist attractions in the Eastern Cape